John Welsh (7 November 1914 – 21 April 1985) was an Irish actor.

Biography
Welsh was born in Wexford. After an early stage career in Dublin, he moved into British film and television in the 1950s. His roles included James Forsyte in the 1967 BBC dramatisation of John Galsworthy's The Forsyte Saga and Sir Pitt Crawley in Thackeray's Vanity Fair, as well as the waiter, Merriman in The Duchess of Duke Street, Sgt. Cuff in The Moonstone and a brief scene as the barber in Brideshead Revisited. He also appeared in Hancock's Half Hour, The Brothers, Prince Regent, To Serve Them All My Days, 'The Frighteners' ('Bed and Breakfast' episode, 1972), and The Citadel, and played the assistant chief constable in the early series of Softly, Softly. Welsh also appeared in a number of different roles in Danger Man that included British diplomats and butlers. He died in London.

Filmography

 The Accused (1953) - Mr. Tennant
 The Clue of the Missing Ape (1953) - Army Intelligence Officer (uncredited)
 An Inspector Calls (1954) - Shop Walker
 Diplomatic Passport (1954) - US Embassy Official (uncredited)
 The Divided Heart (1954) - Chief Marshall
 Isn't Life Wonderful! (1954) - Uncle James
 The Dark Avenger (1955) - Gurd
 Confession (1955) - Father Neil
 Track the Man Down (1955) - 'Smiling' Sam (uncredited)
 Lost (1956) - Police Scientist (uncredited)
 The Man in the Road (1956) - George White - the Gamekeeper
 The Man Who Never Was (1956) - Bank Manager (uncredited)
 Women Without Men (1956) - Prison Chaplain
 The Long Arm (1956) - House Agent at Shepperton
 The Counterfeit Plan (1957) - Police Insp. Grant
 The Secret Place (1957) - Mr. Christian (uncredited)
 Brothers in Law (1957) - Mr. Justice Fanshawe
 The Long Haul (1957) - Doctor
 Man in the Shadow (1957) - Inspector Hunt
 Lucky Jim (1957) - The Principal
 The Surgeon's Knife (1957) - Insp. Austen
 The Birthday Present (1957) - Chief Customs Officer
 The Man Who Wouldn't Talk (1958) - George Fraser (uncredited)
 The Safecracker (1958) - Inspector Owing
 Dunkirk (1958) - Staff Colonel
 Indiscreet (1958) - Passport Official (uncredited)
 The Revenge of Frankenstein (1958) - Bergman
 Next to No Time (1958) - Steve, Bar Steward
 She Didn't Say No! (1958) - Inspector
 Behind the Mask (1958) - Colonel Langley
 Nowhere to Go (1958) - Second Mr. Dodds (uncredited)
 Room at the Top (1959) - Mayor (uncredited)
 Operation Bullshine (1959) - Brigadier
 Bobbikins (1959) - Admiral
 The Rough and the Smooth (1959) - Dr. Thompson
 The Night We Dropped a Clanger (1959) - Squadron Leader Grant
 Beyond the Curtain (1960) - Turner
 The Trials of Oscar Wilde (1960) - Cafe Royal Manager
 Follow That Horse! (1960) - Major Turner
 A Circle of Deception (1960) - Maj. Taylor
 Snowball (1960) - Ted Wylie
 Konga (1961) - First Plain Clothes Officer
 Francis of Assisi (1961) - Canon Cattanei
 Johnny Nobody (1961) - Judge
  Scotland Yard (film series) (1961) - The Square Mile Murder - Inspector Hicks
 Go to Blazes (1962) - Chief Fire Officer
 The Inspector (1962) - Agriculture Officer
 Fog for a Killer (1962) - Governor
 Life for Ruth (1962) - Marshall
 The Quare Fellow (1962) - Carroll
 The Wild and the Willing (1962) - Publican
 The Playboy of the Western World (1963) - Philly Cullen
 Nightmare (1964) - Doctor
 Rasputin: The Mad Monk (1966) - The Abbot
 Attack on the Iron Coast (1968) - Admiral of the Fleet Lord William Cansley
 Subterfuge (1968) - Heiner
 Journey into Darkness (1968) - Bart Brereton (episode 'Paper Dolls')
 The Man Who Haunted Himself (1970) - Sir Charles Freeman
 Cromwell (1970) - Bishop Juxon
 Catweazle (1971) - The Walking Trees - Colonel Arnold Dickenson
  Lord Peter Wimsey (TV series), (The Unpleasantness at the Bellona Club, episode) (1972) - Mr. Murbles
 The Pied Piper (1972) - Chancellor
 A Story of Tutankhamun (1973) - Grandfather
 Yellow Dog (1973) - Bewsley
 Edward the King (1975) - Duke of Wellington
 Kizzy (1976) - Admiral Twiss
 Grayeagle (1977) - Lum Stroud
 The Norseman (1978) - Norseman
 The Thirty Nine Steps (1978) - Lord Belthane
 Les soeurs Brontë (1979)
 From a Far Country (1981) - Priest
Brideshead Revisited (1981) - Barber
 Krull (1983) - The Emerald Seer
 Blott on the Landscape (1985) - Lord Leakham

References

External links

Irish male stage actors
Irish male television actors
Irish male film actors
Actors from County Wexford
1914 births
1985 deaths
20th-century Irish male actors